Giacomo Triga (1674 - 1746)  was an Italian painter, active in Rome, as a painter of religious subjects. 

[[Image:Giacomo Triga San Benito destruye el ídolo de Apolo Abadía de Montserrat.jpg|thumb|St Benedict destroys the idol of Apollo]]

He was born and died in Rome, and trained under Benedetto Luti. He was a member of the Accademia di San Luca and the congregation of the Virtuosi del Pantheon. One of his pupils was Pietro Bianchi, named Il Creatura. He painted a fresco depicting the Glory of San Nicola'' for the church of San Nicola ai Prefetti in Rome. The work was commissioned circa 1729-1730 by his patron, the cardinal Gerolamo Theodoli.

References

External links

1674 births
1746 deaths
Italian Baroque painters
17th-century Italian painters
Italian male painters
18th-century Italian painters
18th-century Italian male artists